18/2 can refer to:
 February 18, in MM/DD notation
 American wire gauge 18, 5 conductor wire, commonly used for thermostats in the United States